Taher Shabbir Mithaiwala is an Indian actor who is known for his portrayal of Viraj Singh Rathore in Nisha Aur Uske Cousins and Arshad Habib in Bepannah.

Personal life
Shabbir graduated with a degree in mass media from KC College, Mumbai. Shabbir got engaged to Akshita Gandhi in August 2020. The two tied the knot in November 2020.

Career
Shabbir rose to prominence in 2014 by portraying Viraj Singh Rathore in Star Plus's Nisha Aur Uske Cousins opposite Aneri Vajani and Mishkat Varma.

He made his film debut in 2016 with Fan where he played Sid Kapoor. In 2017, he portrayed Jai in Naam Shabana.

In 2018, Shabbir portrayed Arshad Habib in Colors TV's Bepannaah opposite Jennifer Winget and Harshad Chopda.

In 2019, he played Sangram Singh in Manikarnika. Next, he was seen as Jimmy in Bypass Road. In 2020, he portrayed Danish Ali Baig in Netflix India's Guilty. Next, he played Pratyush Parashar in Iti: Can You Solve Your Own Murder.

Filmography

Television

Films

Web series

References

Living people
21st-century Indian male actors
Year of birth missing (living people)